This is a list of electoral results for the electoral district of Norman in Queensland state elections.

Members for Norman

Election results

Elections in the 1960s

Elections in the 1950s

References

Queensland state electoral results by district